Kongwa District is one of the seven districts of the Dodoma Region of Tanzania. It is bordered to the north by Manyara Region, to the east by Morogoro Region, to the south by Mpwapwa District, and to the west by Chamwino District. Its district capital is the town of Kongwa.

According to the 2012 Tanzania National Census, the population of Kongwa District was 309,973, up from 249,760 in the 2002 Census.

Transport
Paved trunk road T3 from Morogoro to Dodoma passes through the district.

Administrative subdivisions
As of 2012, Kongwa District was administratively divided into 22 wards.

Wards

 Chamkoroma
 Chitego
 Chiwe
 Hogoro
 Iduo
 Kibaigwa
 Kongwa
 Lenjulu
 Makawa
 Matongoro
 Mkoka
 Mlali
 Mtanana
 Nghumbi
 Ngomai
 Njoge
 Pandambili
 Sagara
 Sejeli
 Songambele
 Ugogoni
 Zoissa

See also
Madunga
Magara
Riroda

References

External links
 Mnyakongo School Project Small group of former Kongwa pupils helping Mnyakongo Primary School

Districts of Dodoma Region